Heinz Gähler (born 23 March 1952) is a Swiss cross-country skier. He competed at the 1976 Winter Olympics and the 1980 Winter Olympics.

References

1952 births
Living people
Swiss male cross-country skiers
Olympic cross-country skiers of Switzerland
Cross-country skiers at the 1976 Winter Olympics
Cross-country skiers at the 1980 Winter Olympics
Place of birth missing (living people)